Yuri Alekseevich Ryzhov (1952 – 2015) was a Soviet football player. Master of Sports of the USSR.

Career
In his youth, Ryzhov started his career in Youth FC Zarya Kaluga. He later started playing in FC Lokomotiv Kaluga; and soon moved to the Moscow team railroad, within which in 1974 won the first league tournament, and in 1975 spent 7 matches and scored 1 goal in the premier league of the USSR; also European Railways Cup (1974). Spent five seasons in the Kemerovo of 	FC Kuzbass, serving first league (played in the attack, along with Vitaly Razdayev (top scorer of the first league USSR Cup in history); in the championship-1977, one of the two most successful club to Kemerovo,  scored 14 goals); also played for the team in the second league.

Yuri Ryzhov died on June 29, 2015 in Kaluga.

References

External links
 Yuri Ryzhov at football.lg.ua
 
 Yuri Ryzhov at fc-kuzbass.ru

1952 births
Soviet Top League players
2015 deaths
Sportspeople from Kaluga
Soviet footballers
FC Lokomotiv Moscow players
FC Lokomotiv Kaluga players
Association football forwards
FC Novokuznetsk players